Bucranium taurifrons is a species of ant-mimicking crab spiders from South America. It is found in Venezuela, Guyana, Peru, Brazil and Paraguay.

Like the crab spider Aphantochilus, it mimic ants of the genus Cephalotes (probably C. atratus), which are their preferred prey. It also carries dead ants.

Name
Tauros means "bull" in Greek, frons is Latin for "front".

References

Thomisidae
Spiders of South America
Spiders described in 1881